On the medial part of the clavicle is a broad rough surface, the costal tuberosity (impression for costoclavicular ligament), rather more than 2 cm. in length, for the attachment of the costoclavicular ligament.

References 

Shoulder
Skeletal system
Upper limb anatomy
Clavicle